Triloquist is a 2008 American horror film written and directed by Mark Jones and produced by Jack Edward Sawyers, Marlon Parry, and Michael Levine. It stars Paydin LoPachin, Rocky Marquette, Katie Chonacas and Brian Krause.

Plot

In a hotel in Hollywood California, a young lady (Dagmar Peterson) is a down and out ventriloquist who can't find work anymore. She is also a drug addict. One night the hotel manager comes in and tells her she has to pay the rent tomorrow or her and her two kids, Angelina and Norbert, will be thrown out.

The mother doesn't know what to do, so she drugs herself again, this time killing her. The Dummy (Bruce Weitz) watches and wakes up Angelina and Norbert from sleep. The Dummy tells them that it is now the three of them. Later on, Angelina, Norbert, and the Dummy are sent to their perverted uncle's house. The uncle (Fred Cameron) ends up abusing Angelina and the Dummy is not happy. While the uncle is sleeping, Dummy suffocates him.

Dummy is then put in a suitcase for several years. He is then taken out to see Angelina (Paydin LoPachin) and Norbert (Rocky Marquette) all grown up. Dummy is used to talk for Norbert (He was in shock when he saw his mother died). On Halloween night, Dummy ends up killing a young kid for not believing Norbert is not a magic Triloquist. Angelina ends up blaming Norbert for cutting off the boy's fingers. Norbert is taking away and Angelina and Dummy have to break him out.

Angelina and Dummy end up working at a strip club, killing the manager (Andrew Zak) for not letting Angelina do a ventriloquist act. Taking his car, Angelina ends up going after Norbert. When the doctor won't let Norbert leave, Dummy ends up having to kill another person, this time a worker. Norbert and Dummy reunite with Angelina with a "group hug".

Angelina, Norbert, and Dummy head down to Vegas so Norbert can do his ventriloquist act. While eating at a restaurant, Angelina reveals that if Norbert doesn't have a son, their triloquist name would die out. Angelina thinks that a girl named Robin Patterson (Katie Chonacas) would be the perfect mother. They end up kidnapping Robin and place her in the trunk of the car.

While on the road, they are stopped by the police again. He sees Robin tied up and Angelina ends up shooting him with a gun. Back on the road, they stop help out another man with car trouble. They end up robbing him and killing him.

They stop at a gas station and Dummy thinks it would be a perfect time to ditch Angelina and be free. Norbert refuses and Angelina comes back hearing Dummy and throwing him out of the car. Angelina and Dummy agree not to leave each other. Angelina gives Dummy back to Norbert. The police show up and Angelina tries to blame Norbert again. They take Norbert and Angelina into the car and rescue Robin.

While driving in the police car, Robin reveals to the officer (Brian Krause) that Norbert never said a word. When they realize that an officer has been killed, Angelina kills the officer that rescued Robin. They take her to a cabin and Norbert is to get her pregnant and hopefully have a son. When Robin talks Dummy and Norbert into letting her use the phone, Angelina shows up and shoves Robin into a room and Norbert ties her up. Angelina decides to punish Dummy by having Dummy set his tongue on fire with a match.

Later on, Angelina says that they should go to Vegas and leave the dummy behind. The Next Morning, a janitor comes into the cabin and finds Robin, who ends up dead by Dummy who rides him like a horse (choking him in the process) Angelina and Norbert discover that they are being followed by the police. Angelina decides to kill Robin in the woods and head to Vegas.

That night, Angelina, Norbert, Dummy, and Robin end up in the woods. Robin begins to bury her grave when she escapes into an old DJ room. Robin finds Detective Shane Kinslow (the person who saved her) dead. Angelina, Norbert, and Dummy show up again. Angelina says that Norbert should rape Robin and get her pregnant. Before Norbert could, Robin reveals that she is in love with him. Being tricked, Robin takes a knife and stabs Dummy. While trying to escape, Robin is knocked out by Angelina. Angelina reveals that she made up the triloquist act and that she has been doing the voice of Dummy.

Furious, Norbert attempts to kill Angelina. But Angelina pushes Norbert into cables and is shocked to death. Still alive, Norbert starts talking for the first time to Dummy that he is dying. Waking up, Robin finally escapes. When Angelina takes Dummy outside, Norbert tries to kill Angelina, but ends up getting stabbed by a knife. Dying, Norbert ask is Dummy could sing to him, Dummy accepts and sings to Norbert. When Norbert dies, Dummy does too. Robin is able to find help and shows the police where she was attacked.

When they arrive, Dummy and Angelina are gone leaving Norbert's dead body lying there. Robin reveals that they got magic and are heading to Vegas. Dummy reveals that Angelina got to depressed and never became a star in Vegas. Angelina figures out the she is pregnant with Norbert's baby, she gives birth to the baby in the hotel from the beginning, and dies after. Dummy (still alive) holds the baby boy like a proud papa. The film goes to black and the credits role.

Cast
Paydin LoPachin as Angelina
Rocky Marquette as Norbert
Katie Chonacas as Robin Patterson
Brian Krause as Detective
Tha Realest as Rapper

Release
Triloquist was released on Dimension Extreme DVD in 2008.

See also
Ventriloquism

External links
 
 
 Trailer for Mark Jones' TRILOQUIST

2008 films
American horror films
Incest in film
2008 horror films
Dimension Films films
2000s English-language films
2000s American films